The 2017–18 EHF Challenge Cup was the 21st edition of the European Handball Federation's third-tier competition for men's handball clubs, running from 7 October 2017 to 20 May 2018.

Overview

Team allocation

Round and draw dates 
All draws held at the European Handball Federation headquarters in Vienna, Austria.

Round 2 
Teams listed first played the first leg at home. Some teams agreed to play both matches in the same venue. Bolded teams qualified into Round 3.

 
|}

Round 3 
Teams listed first played the first leg at home. Some teams agreed to play both matches in the same venue. Bolded teams qualified into last 16.

|}

Last 16 
The draw for the last 16 round was held on Tuesday, 28 November 2017. The draw seeding pots were composed as follows:

Teams listed first played the first leg at home. Some teams agreed to play both matches in the same venue. Bolded teams qualified into quarterfinals.

|}

Quarterfinals 

The draw for the quarter-final and semi-final pairings was held at the EHF Office in Vienna on 20 February at 11:00 hrs.
.

The first quarter-final leg was scheduled for 24–25 March, while the second leg followed on 31 March–1 April 2018.

|}

Matches

Madeira Andebol SAD won 55–48 on aggregate.

IBV Vestmannaeyjar won 66–51 on aggregate.

A.E.K. Athens won 64–43 on aggregate.

AHC Potaissa Turda won 59–56 on aggregate.

Semifinals 

The first semi-final legs was scheduled for 21–22 April 2018, while the second legs followed on 28–29 April 2018.

|}

Matches

A.E.K. Athens won 52–44 on aggregate.

AHC Potaissa Turda won 56–55 on aggregate.

Final 

The first leg was played on 14 May and the second was played on 20 May.

|}

Matches

AHC Potaissa Turda won 59–49 on aggregate.

See also 
 2017–18 EHF Champions League
 2017–18 EHF Cup
 2017–18 Women's EHF Cup

References

External links 
 EHF Challenge Cup (official website)

Challenge Cup
Challenge Cup
EHF Challenge Cup